George D. "Geordie" Neave (fl. 1895–96) was a footballer who made 29 appearances in the Football League playing for Lincoln City as a centre half. He was also on the books of Dundee.

References

Year of birth missing
Year of death missing
Place of birth missing
Association football defenders
Lincoln City F.C. players
Dundee F.C. players
English Football League players
Place of death missing
English footballers